Omorgus fuliginosus is a beetle of the family Trogidae. It occurs in Texas, Mexico, El Salvador, and Costa Rica.

References
 Catalogue of Life: 2007 Annual Checklist - Omorgus fuliginosus
 

fuliginosus
Beetles of North America
Beetles described in 1941